Parentucellia is a small genus of flowering plants in the family Orobanchaceae containing about four species. They are known generally as glandweeds. The genus was named for Pope Nicholas V, whose surname was Parentucelli.

Phylogeny
The phylogeny of the genera of Rhinantheae has been explored using molecular characters. Parentucellia belongs to the core Rhinantheae. It is closely related to the genus Bellardia, and then to Odontites, Tozzia and Hedbergia. In turn, these genera share phylogenetic affinities with Euphrasia and Bartsia.

Systematics
Species include:
Parentucellia floribunda
Parentucellia latifolia
Parentucellia viscosa

References

External links
USDA Plants: Parentucellia in North America

Orobanchaceae
Orobanchaceae genera
Parasitic plants